Devil-May-Care is a 1929 American Pre-Code musical film directed by Sidney Franklin with a Technicolor sequence of the Albertina Rasch Dancers. The film was released by Metro-Goldwyn-Mayer on December 27, 1929 and was Ramon Novarro's talkie debut.

The film is based upon the 1851 play La Bataille de dames, ou un duel en amour by Ernest Legouvé and Eugène Scribe. It is known by a variety of other names, including Battle of the Ladies (the film's working title), Der Leutnant des Kaisers (Austria), Der jüngste Leutnant (Germany), Il tenente di Napoleone (Italy), and O lohagos tis aftokratorikis frouras (Greece).

Plot

Cast
 Ramon Novarro as Armand
 Dorothy Jordan as Leonie
 Marion Harris as Louise
 John Miljan as DeGrignon
 William Humphrey as Napoleon
 George Davis as Groom
 Clifford Bruce as Gaston
 Lionel Belmore as Innkeeper (uncredited)
 John Carroll as Bonapartist (uncredited)
 George Chandler as Timid Royalist (uncredited)
 Ann Dvorak as Chorine (uncredited)
 Bob Kortman as Bonapartist (uncredited)

Soundtrack
 "Shepherd Serenade"
Written by Clifford Grey and Herbert Stothart
 "Charming"
Written by Clifford Grey and Herbert Stothart
 "If He Cared"
Written by Clifford Grey and Herbert Stothart
 "March of the Guard"
Written by Clifford Grey and Herbert Stothart
 "Love Ballet"
Written by Dimitri Tiomkin
Performed by Albertina Rasch Dancers

See also
 List of early color feature films

References

External links

Lobby poster

1929 films
1929 musical films
1920s color films
Metro-Goldwyn-Mayer films
American films based on plays
Films based on works by Eugène Scribe
Films directed by Sidney Franklin
Films scored by Herbert Stothart
American black-and-white films
American musical films
1920s American films
Films with screenplays by Richard Schayer
1920s English-language films